The 1989 La Flèche Wallonne was the 53rd edition of La Flèche Wallonne cycle race and was held on 12 April 1989. The race started in Spa and finished in Huy. The race was won by Claude Criquielion of the Hitachi team.

General classification

References

1989 in road cycling
1989
1989 in Belgian sport
April 1989 sports events in Europe